Elmira is an unincorporated community in Fulton County, in the U.S. state of Ohio.

History
A post office was established at Elmira in 1839, and about eleven years later was moved to Burlington where the office apparently retained the name Elmira.

Elmira is a trailhead for the Wabash Cannonball Trail, a rail trail conversion of the defunct Wabash Railroad. A 210-foot railroad bridge spans the Tiffin River on the trail just west of the community.

References

Unincorporated communities in Fulton County, Ohio
Unincorporated communities in Ohio